Aziel Jackson (born October 25, 2001) is an American professional soccer player who plays as a midfielder for Major League Soccer club St. Louis City.

Career

Youth
Jackson joined the New York Red Bulls academy in 2014, where he played until 2017. In 2017, he moved with his family to France, subsequently joining the Toulouse academy until 2018.  He also spent time with Championnat National 3 side Blagnac. In 2019, he returned to the United States, joining the Crossfire FC academy, as well as training with Seattle Sounders FC in 2020.

Minnesota United
On April 30, 2021, Jackson signed a homegrown player contract Major League Soccer club Minnesota United, who acquired his rights from New York Red Bulls in exchange for a third-round pick in the 2022 MLS SuperDraft. On August 24, 2021, Jackson was loaned to USL League One side North Carolina FC.

On March 23, 2022, it was announced Jackson would spend the season with Minnesota United FC 2, the club's MLS Next Pro side.

St. Louis City
On November 7, 2022, Jackson was traded to St. Louis City in exchange for $150,000 of General Allocation Money ahead of the club's inaugural MLS season.

Personal
Aziel is the son of jazz drummer and composer Ali Jackson Jr.

Honors
Individual
MLS Next Pro Best XI: 2022

References

External links
 Profile at Minnesota United

2001 births
Living people
American expatriate soccer players
American expatriate sportspeople in France
American soccer players
Association football midfielders
Blagnac FC players
Championnat National 3 players
Homegrown Players (MLS)
North Carolina FC players
Minnesota United FC players
Soccer players from New York City
Toulouse FC players
USL League One players
MLS Next Pro players